Daniel Adshead (born 2 September 2001) is an English professional footballer who plays as a midfielder for EFL League One club Cheltenham Town.

Club career

Rochdale
Born in Manchester, Adshead is a product of the Rochdale Academy. He began training with the first team at the age of 14. He attracted scouts from Manchester City, Manchester United, Chelsea, Arsenal, Liverpool, Tottenham Hotspur, Barcelona and Bayern Munich.

In 2016, he made his debut for Rochdale under-18s aged just 15. Adshead travelled with the first team during a pre-season camp to Tenerife in July 2017.

In September 2017, he became the club's youngest ever player with an appearance in the EFL Trophy aged 16 years, 17 days. Due to child protection regulations, Adshead had to change away from his teammates.

Norwich City
On 18 June 2019, Adshead signed for newly promoted Premier League club Norwich City for an undisclosed fee.

Loan to Telstar
On 26 August 2020, Adshead joined Dutch second-tier club SC Telstar on loan for the 2020–21 season.

Loan to Gillingham
On 19 August 2021, Adshead joined League One club Gillingham on loan. Having suffered an injury that had prevented him featuring for the Kent side since November, it was confirmed on 11 February 2022 that he had returned to his parent club.

Cheltenham Town
On 21 June 2022, Adshead joined League One club Cheltenham Town for an undisclosed fee, signing a two-year contract.

International career
On 9 November 2018, Adshead was called up to the England U18 team for the first time for a tournament in Spain. He scored on his debut against the Netherlands.

On 5 September 2019, Adshead scored on his England U19s debut during a 3–1 victory over Greece at St. George's Park

Career statistics

References

External links

Profile at the Norwich City F.C. website

2001 births
Living people
Footballers from Manchester
English footballers
England youth international footballers
Association football midfielders
Rochdale A.F.C. players
Norwich City F.C. players
SC Telstar players
Gillingham F.C. players
Cheltenham Town F.C. players
English Football League players
Eerste Divisie players
English expatriate footballers
Expatriate footballers in the Netherlands
English expatriate sportspeople in the Netherlands